Gyromancy is the fifth studio album by the free improvisation ensemble Mnemonist Orchestra, released in 1984 by Dys Records.

Track listing

Personnel 
Adapted from the Horde liner notes.

Mnemonists
 Amy Derbyshire – instruments
 Mark Derbyshire – instruments, engineering
 Karen Nakai – instruments
 Mark Piersel – instruments
 Steve Scholbe – instruments
 William Sharp – instruments

Production and additional personnel
 Thomas Beckwith – photography
 Richard Donaldson – mastering

Release history

References

External links 
 

1984 albums
Biota (band) albums
Recommended Records albums